TV 2 Sport may refer to:
TV 2 Sport (Denmark), owned by TV 2 (Denmark)
TV 2 Sport (Norway), owned by TV 2 (Norway) and Telenor